François Louis de Bourbon, le Grand Conti (30 April 1664 – 22 February 1709), was Prince de Conti, succeeding his brother, Louis Armand de Bourbon, in 1685. Until this date, he used the title of Prince of La Roche-sur-Yon. He was son of Armand de Bourbon, Prince of Conti and Anne Marie Martinozzi, daughter of Girolamo Martinozzi and niece of Cardinal Mazarin, through her mother. He was proclaimed as the King of Poland in 1697. He is the most famous member of the Conti family, a cadet branch of the Princes of Condé. As a member of the reigning House of Bourbon, he was a prince du sang.

Biography
Born at the Hôtel de Conti (quai Malaquais) in Paris, he was the last of his parents' children. He had one older brother, Louis Armand I, Prince of Conti (1661–1685), who married Marie Anne de Bourbon, the illegitimate daughter of King Louis XIV of France and his mistress, Louise de La Vallière.

In 1683, he assisted the Imperialists in Hungary, and while there, he wrote some letters in which he referred to King Louis XIV as le roi du théâtre; because of this, and because of an early engagement at the side of the Turks, in 1685, on his return to France, he was temporarily banished to Chantilly.

Conti was the protégé of his uncle, Louis de Bourbon, le Grand Condé, whose granddaughter, Marie Thérèse de Bourbon (1666–1732), he married at the Palace of Versailles on 22 January 1688, before the assembled court. Together, they had seven children.

The bride was passionately in love with her husband, but his attentions focused elsewhere. It was well known at court that he was in love with his wife's sister-in-law, Louise-Françoise de Bourbon, wife of Louis III, Prince of Condé, who was the eldest legitimated daughter of King Louis XIV and his mistress, Madame de Montespan. Marie Anne de Bourbon, the daughter of Louise-Françoise de Bourbon, was thought to have been the fruit of this affair. It was also noted, however, that he had homosexual  tendencies and did not pay his wife much attention. He lived as a libertine, engaging in numerous love affairs with members of both sexes. His scandalous philandering and debaucheries caused tension and distance within the family, and earned him the nickname of le Grand Conti.

He served in the French army, but he never managed to achieve a rank higher than lieutenant-general.  In 1689, he accompanied his intimate friend, François Henri de Montmorency, duc de Luxembourg, to the Netherlands, and shared in the French victories at Fleurus, Steinkirk, and Neerwinden. On the death of his cousin, Jean Louis d'Orléans, Duke of Longueville (1646–1694), and in accordance to his will, Conti claimed the principality of Neuchâtel against Marie d'Orleans-Longueville, Duchess de Nemours (1625–1707), a sister of the Duke.

He failed to obtain military assistance from the Swiss, and by the King's command, yielded the disputed territory to Marie d'Orleans, although the courts of law had decided in his favour. In 1697, King Louis XIV offered him the Polish crown, and by means of bribes, the Abbé de Polignac secured his election. On 27 June 1697, he was formally proclaimed as the King of Poland by Cardinal Radziejowski.

Conti started rather unwillingly for his new kingdom, probably, as the Duke of Saint-Simon remarks, owing to his affection for Louise-Françoise de Bourbon. He departed on the Railleuse, under Captain Jean Bart, on 6 September 1697.

When he reached Danzig, he found his rival Augustus II, Elector of Saxony, already in possession of the Polish crown. Conti returned to France, where he was graciously received by King Louis XIV, although Saint-Simon says the King was vexed to see him again. But the misfortunes of the French armies, during the earlier years of the War of the Spanish Succession, compelled the King to appoint Conti, whose military renown stood very high, to command the troops in Italy.

On 4 February 1699, Conti purchased the Château d'Issy, a small French Baroque château on the outskirts of Paris, bought for the sum of 140,000 livres. The estate remained the property of the Princes of Conti until the Revolution of 1789, when it was confiscated as biens nationaux.

The Prince of Conti fell ill and died on 22 February 1709 at the Hôtel de Conti (quai Conti), his death calling forth exceptional signs of mourning from all classes. He died from a combination of gout and syphilis. He was buried alongside his mother at his estate in L'Isle-Adam, Val-d'Oise, near Paris.

He was succeeded as Prince de Conti by his eldest son, Louis Armand II de Bourbon (1696–1727).

Issue
Conti married Marie Thérèse de Bourbon, aged 22, who was the daughter of Henri Jules, Prince of Condé and Princess Anne Henriette of the Palatinate. They had the following seven children together:

Marie Anne de Bourbon (18 April 1689 - 21 March 1720), married Louis Henri I, Prince of Condé, but had no issue.
Prince of La Roche-sur-Yon (18 November 1693 - 22 November 1693), died in infancy.
Prince of La Roche-sur-Yon (1 December 1694 - 25 April 1698), died in infancy.
Louis Armand II, Prince of Conti (10 November 1695 - 4 May 1727), married Louise Élisabeth de Bourbon, daughter of Louis III, Prince of Condé, and had issue.
Louise Adélaïde de Bourbon (2 November 1696 – 20 November 1750), died unmarried but had many illegitimate children.
Mademoiselle d'Alais (19 November 1697 - 13 August 1699), died in infancy.
Louis François de Bourbon, Count of Alais (27 July 1703 - 21 January 1704), died in infancy.

Ancestry

References

External links

1664 births
1709 deaths
17th-century French LGBT people
17th-century peers of France
18th-century French LGBT people
18th-century peers of France
Bisexual men
Candidates for the Polish elective throne
Counts of La Marche
Francois Louis
French bisexual people
LGBT Roman Catholics
LGBT royalty
Nobility from Paris
Francois Louis
Francois Louis